The 1850 Yamsé Ghoon Riots refer to violent clashes which erupted in Port Louis, the capital of British Mauritius in November 1850.

Clash of ethnic groups
Muslims of Indian ancestry were commemorating the Mourning of Muharram in the form of an annual procession in the suburb of Port Louis which was known as Camp Des Malabars (or Plaine Verte nowadays). The event was also known as Yamsé or Ghoon. However they were attacked by former slaves of Creole origins, also known as ex-apprentices. The Muslims were forced to abandon their Ghoon structures or Ta'zieh as they were chased around the streets in broad daylight by the Creole assailants.

Aftermath of riots
Several fatalities were reported. However the inaction of the Chief of Police Charles Anderson was criticised.

References

Murder in Mauritius
History of Mauritius
Ethnic riots
Riots and civil disorder in Mauritius
Anti-Indian racism in Africa
1850 murders in Africa 
19th-century murders in Mauritius